Veslbreatinden is a mountain in Lom Municipality in Innlandet county, Norway. The mountain is surrounded by several other notable mountains including Loftet and Veslfjelltinden to the north; Skagsnebb to the northeast; Galdhøpiggen and Sauhøi to the east; Storbreahøe, Storbreatinden, and Rundhøe to the southeast; and Store Smørstabbtinden and Kniven to the south.

See also
List of mountains of Norway by height

References

Jotunheimen
Lom, Norway
Mountains of Innlandet